The tables list the Malayalam films released in theaters in the year 2015. Premiere shows and film festival screenings are not considered as releases for this list.

Released films

Dubbed films

Notable deaths

References

External links

2015
2015
Malayalam
Malayalam